Robert Milarvie (1864 – November 1912) was a Scottish footballer.

Career
Milarvie played for Pollokshield and Hibernian before moving south to join Stoke, where he played in the first season of the Football League, scoring five goals in fifteen matches for a struggling Stoke side who finished bottom of the table. He moved on to nearby Burslem Port Vale in the summer of 1889. He made his Vale debut in a 1–1 friendly match against Halliwell at the Athletic Ground on 2 September 1889, but his club were censured by the Football Association for fielding him as he had also signed for Derby County, with County then winning the fight for his services.

He left Derby in 1890 to sign with Newton Heath, he played four games for the club in the Football Alliance before moving on to neighbours Ardwick the following year. He played 19 Alliance league games in 1891–92, the final year of the league's existence. The club were then elected into the Football League Second Division, and Milarvie made 19 appearances in 1892–93. He played 23 games in 1893–94, but then lost his first team place to the new signings of Billy Meredith, Wally McReddie and Pat Finnerhan. Ardwick changed their name to Manchester City in 1894–95, and Milarvie left the club at the conclusion of the 1895–96 campaign.

Career statistics
Source:

References

1864 births
1912 deaths
Footballers from Glasgow
Scottish footballers
Association football forwards
Hibernian F.C. players
Stoke City F.C. players
Port Vale F.C. players
Derby County F.C. players
Manchester United F.C. players
Manchester City F.C. players
English Football League players
Football Alliance players